The 2012–13 IFA Premiership (known as the Danske Bank Premiership for sponsorship reasons) was the fifth season of Northern Ireland's national football league in this format since its inception in 2008, and the 112th season of Irish league football overall.

The season began on 11 August 2012 and ended on 27 April 2013. This was the last season of the league under the control of the Irish Football Association. From the following season onwards, the league became part of the newly created Northern Ireland Football League.

Linfield were the defending champions after winning their third consecutive title – their 51st league title overall last season. This season however, Cliftonville were the champions for the fourth time overall and the first time since the 1997–98 season. It was also the first time in eleven years that neither Linfield or Glentoran had won the title, with the previous occasion being 2001–02 when Portadown won their fourth title.

Lisburn Distillery finished bottom of the table and were relegated to Championship 1 after a 2–0 defeat to Ballymena United on 16 April 2013. The club had participated in all 112 seasons of senior football so far, and at the time were one of only four clubs to have done so; the others being Cliftonville, Linfield and Glentoran. The club had not been outside the top division since winning the 2001–02 Irish League First Division title, which at the time was the second tier of senior football. However, the restructuring of the league system in 2003 consolidated senior football into one division, which meant that this was the first time in the club's history that they had been relegated to intermediate football. This brought an end to both their 123-year stay in senior football, and their 11-year stay in the top flight. 11th-placed Donegal Celtic joined them in Championship 1, after losing on the away goals rule to Warrenpoint Town in the Promotion/relegation play-off following a 2–2 draw on aggregate. This was the first time since the 2005–06 season that two clubs had been promoted to, and relegated from the top flight.

Teams
2011–12 Championship 1 winners Ballinamallard United were promoted to this season's Premiership after successfully gaining the required Championship Club Licence from the IFA. Last season's bottom-placed Premiership club Carrick Rangers replaced them in Championship 1 after only one season in the top flight.

Championship 1 runners-up Newry City lost out on promotion, as last season's 11th placed club Lisburn Distillery defeated them 3–2 on aggregate in the Promotion/relegation play-off.

Stadia and locations

League table

Results

Matches 1–22
During matches 1–22 each team played every other team twice (home and away).

Matches 23–33
During matches 23–33 each team played every other team for the third time (either at home, or away).

Matches 34–38
During matches 34–38 each team played every other team in their half of the table once. As this was the fourth time that teams played each other this season, home sides in this round were chosen so that they played each other twice at home and twice away.

Section A

Section B

Promotion/relegation play-off
Donegal Celtic played Warrenpoint Town, the runners-up of the 2012–13 IFA Championship 1 in a two-legged tie for a place in next season's NIFL Premiership. Warrenpoint Town won the tie on the away goals rule to reach the top flight for the first time in the club's history. Donegal Celtic were relegated to next season's Championship 1.

2–2 on aggregate. Warrenpoint Town won on away goals rule and were promoted. Donegal Celtic were relegated.

Top scorers

IFA Premiership clubs in Europe 2012–13

UEFA coefficient and ranking
For the 2012–13 UEFA competitions, the associations were allocated places according to their 2011 UEFA country coefficients, which took into account their performance in European competitions from 2006–07 to 2010–11. In the 2011 rankings used for this season's European competitions, Northern Ireland's coefficient points total was 2.249. After earning a score of 1.125 during the 2010–11 European campaign, the league was ranked by UEFA as the 49th best league in Europe out of 53 – not moving from 49th the previous season. This season Northern Ireland earned 1.125 points, which was added to the points total for the 2013 rankings used in 2014–15 UEFA competitions.

 47  Armenia 2.583 48  Malta 2.416 49  Northern Ireland 2.249
 50  Faroe Islands 1.416 51  Luxembourg 1.374''
 Full list

UEFA Champions League
First qualifying round

After winning the league last season, Linfield were the league's sole representatives in the UEFA Champions League. They entered the draw at the first qualifying round where they were drawn to face B36 Tórshavn from the Faroe Islands. The first leg at Windsor Park ended in a 0–0 draw, with Linfield missing several opportunities to score, and Peter Thompson missing a penalty. The second leg was played on 10 July 2012 in the Faroe Islands, and again the teams were inseparable and the game finished as another 0–0 stalemate. The tie went to extra time and with still no goals, a penalty shootout. Linfield won the shootout 4–3 and progressed to the second qualifying round.

Second Qualifying round

They were drawn to face AEL Limassol of Cyprus. The first leg against was played on 18 July 2012 in Cyprus. Linfield succumbed to a 3–0 defeat in the searing heat against their full-time opponents. The return leg at Windsor Park was played on 25 July 2012. This time, Linfield managed to hold their opponents to a 0–0 draw, but it was not enough, and they left the competition 3–0 on aggregate.

UEFA Europa League
First qualifying round

2011–12 League runners-up Portadown, 3rd-placed Cliftonville, and Irish Cup runners-up Crusaders all earned a place in the UEFA Europa League. They entered the competition at the first qualifying round.

Cliftonville faced Kalmar FF from Sweden. The home leg was played on 5 July 2012, with Cliftonville earning a 1–0 win, Liam Boyce scoring the winning goal in the 71st minute. However, the away leg ended in a 4–0 defeat, and Cliftonville bowed out of the competition 4–1 on aggregate.

Crusaders got perhaps the toughest draw, after they were paired with Rosenborg BK from Norway, a club that reached the group stage of the 2007–08 UEFA Champions League, and held Chelsea to a 1–1 draw at Stamford Bridge in a group stage match. The first leg was played on 5 July 2012 at Seaview. Crusaders were second best for most of the match, with Rosenborg earning a comfortable 3–0 win. The second leg also ended in a Crusaders defeat, this time 1–0. Crusaders exited the competition 4–0 on aggregate.

Portadown were drawn to face Macedonian side FK Shkëndija. The first leg was played on 3 July 2012 in Macedonia, and ended in a 0–0 draw. The second leg was played on 10 July at Shamrock Park. Portadown fell behind in the 4th minute, but second-half goals from Richard Lecky and Ross Redman won the match for Portadown and they went through 2–1 on aggregate.

Second qualifying round

Portadown then faced NK Slaven Belupo from Croatia in the second qualifying round, with the first leg in Croatia being played on 19 July 2012. They were unable to repeat their heroics from the previous round, and fell to a heavy 6–0 defeat at the hands of their Croatian hosts. The second leg was played on 26 July 2012, with the Ports seemingly only having pride left to play for. They restored some pride by scoring 2 goals, but still lost the game 4–2. Portadown left the competition after a rather heavy 10–2 aggregate defeat.

That ended the IFA Premiership's involvement in Europe this season.

References

2012-13
North
1